Public Attorney's Office could refer to:

 Public Prosecutor's Office (Brazil)
 Public Attorney's Office (Philippines)
 Public Attorney's Office of the Republic of Serbia